The House of Jakšić (Јакшићи / Jakšići) was a prominent Serbian noble family from the 15th and 16th century, in the Serbian Despotate and the Kingdom of Hungary. The eponymous founder, Jakša, was a Voivode (Duke) in the service of Serbian Despot Đurađ Branković, and after the fall of Serbia to the Ottomans (1459) his descendants joined the ranks of the Hungarian army, and gained prominence in wars against the Ottoman Empire. Hungarian King Matthias Corvinus granted them possessions in various counties, from Nădlac, to Syrmia and Valkó. The male line of the family died out in 1543.

History

Jakša
Jakša was a voivode in the Serbian Despotate, under Despot Đurađ Branković. Jakša was mentioned in 1452 as Đurađ's envoy in the Republic of Ragusa. As an Ottoman vassal, Đurađ was forced to send an army to participate in the siege of Constantinople (1453). Sultan Mehmed the Conqueror did not tell Đurađ his intentions, but said that the cavalry would travel to Karaman. The sultan slaughtered civilians on his way to Constantinople, which he quickly besieged, Jakša hearing of this, wanted to return but was warned that if they would not continue, the sultan would destroy the Serbs. The cavalry reached the fallen Constantinople, which had been the cradle of Southeastern Christianity and culture, up until now serving as the capital of the Byzantine Empire. The event is recorded in the writings of Konstantin Mihailović, who was in the army of Jakša.

Jakšić brothers
Stefan and Dmitar Jakšić, the sons of Jakša (hence Jakšići), left Jagodina with 1200 warriors for Hungary. They were hospitably received by Matthias Corvinus, who gave them Nădlac (Nagylak) and estates around Moriš, to rule as vassals in 1464. The operations of the Serbian nobility in Slovakia against Germany and Poland in the second half of the 15th century, were hugely successful and as such were lavishly celebrated. Dmitar held dozens of settlements of Pomorišje, and with his cavalry detachment hidden in the woods, and great skill and courage, he led victories against the Polish armies at Humenné and Michalovce in 1473. Dmitar was the general of King Matthias in a battle of Košice in 1474, of which he has been celebrated of in Serbian epic poetry. In 1476, Dmitar took part in the battle of Pančevo, alongside Despot Vuk Grgurević.  In 1479, Dmitar participated in the Battle of Breadfield with some 900 Serbs, the outcome was a decisive Hungarian victory. Dmitar is remembered as one of the most distinguished generals of the Black Army of Hungary, which was primarily composed of Bohemians and Serbs. The brothers had risen in the ranks of barons through their military service, as did Vuk, Ladislaus Egervari, Paul Kinizsi and many more.

Stefan is remembered for his victory in a duel against a Polish swashbuckler that resulted in the withdrawal of the Polish army in 1490. The next year, in December 1491, another battle is fought at Košice between Polish King John I Albert and Hungarian King Vladislaus II. The Hungarian victory was largely due to the Serbian warriors led by Miloš Velmužević and the Jakšić brothers.

Despot Vuk, Dmitar Jakšić, and his son Jovan Jakšić took part in the campaign of King Matthias against the Turks in 1481, when the Christian army arrived at Kruševac. Jovan's detachment liberated Golubac. With the retreat from Serbia, some 110,000 Serbs joined up, settling in the vicinity of Timișoara. Dmitar, on his way back from Turkey as a deputy of the King at the Sultan's court, was attacked and seriously wounded near Smederevo.  He died from his wounds on November 8, 1486, while his brother Stefan died in 1489.

Last generation
In May 1514, an uprising was instigated by György Dózsa against the Landed nobility. The uprising spread over a great part of south Hungary, over Banat, Bačka to Syrmia. It affected a part of Serbs, the properties of the Jakšić brothers in Nădlac were destroyed and a part of the former Despot's. The greater part of Hungarian Serbs aided the royalty and nobility against the kurucs. Marko Jakšić, the son of Stefan, took part in the Battle of Mohács in 1526.

The last nobility as ktetors of Hilandar, were the Jakšići. Despotissa Angelina Branković asked Vasili III for help to Hilandar. The Hilandar clerics had in the mid 16th century asked Emperor Ivan IV for protection and material aid. Ivan the Terrible became the new ktetor of Hilandar. He was the great-grandson of Stefan Jakšić.  The last Jakšić nobleman died in 1543.

Serbian epic poetry
Post-Kosovo cycle.
 Dioba Jakšića
 Dioba Jakšića (iz Crne Gore)
 Jakšići kušaju svoje ljube
 Jakšićima dvori poharani
 Ženidba Jakšića Mitra (iz Sinja)
 Ženidba Jakšića Mitra (iz Srema)
 Ženidba Teodora Jakšića
 Ropstvo i Ženidba Jakšića Šćepana
 Dva Jakšića i sestra im Jela

Genealogy

Jakša Brežičić, voivode of Despot Đurađ Branković.
Stefan Jakšić (?-1489), married Milica (fl. 1506)
Dmitar Jakšić, died young.
Stefan Jakšić (?-1520)
Marko Jakšić (?-1537), married Poliksena
Stefan Jakšić,
Jovana Jakšić, married to Mihailo Bakić (1536)
Jelisaveta Jakšić, married Nikola of Dóc (Dóczy Miklós).
Marija Jakšić, married Koloman Artandi (Ártándy Kelemen)
Milica (Potencija) Jakšić, married Jovan Kendefi.
Margita Jakšić, married Božidar Patočija.
Sholastika Jakšić, married Vladislav Zelemiri.
Ana Jakšić, married Gáspár Bánffy de Losonc, then Antal Kendi.
Ana Jakšić, married Vasili Lvovich Glinsky
Elena Glinskaya, married Vasili III Ivanovich
Ivan the Terrible, Grand Prince of Moscow 1547–1584
Jelena Jakšić, married Despot Jovan Branković, then Jovan Berislavić
Irina Jakšić, married Matija Hercegović Kosača.
Dmitar Jakšić (?-1486), married Jelena Branković 
Jovan Jakšić
Dmitar Jakšić (?-1510)
Petar Jakšić, married Katarina Csáki (Csáki Katalin).
Dmitar Jakšić (?-1539)
Nikola Jakšić (?-1539)
Jovan Jakšić (?-1543)
Đorđe Jakšić

References

Sources

Extern links
The Noble House of Jaksic (RTS Documentary - Official Channel)

15th-century Serbian nobility
16th-century Serbian nobility
Serbian noble families
Serbian Despotate
Hungarian nobility